James L. D. Morrison was an American football player and coach. He served as the first part-time head coach at the University of Notre Dame and Hillsdale College in 1894.

Notre Dame took a significant step toward respectability, prominence, and stability when they hired a part-time coach, bearded James L. Morrison. He wrote an acquaintance after his first day on the job: "I arrived here [Notre Dame] this morning and found about as green a set of football players that ever donned a uniform…They want to smoke, and when I told them that they would have to run and get up some wind, they thought I was rubbing it in on them. "One big, strong cuss remarked that it was too much like work. Well, maybe you think I didn't give him hell! I bet you a hundred no one ever makes a remark like that again." ... Morrison had been hired for $40 plus expenses for two weeks.

Morrison had played tackle at the University of Michigan. He stressed conditioning, speed, and an abundance of end runs and convinced his players that conditioning and speed would lead them to victory. Such tactics led to an opening 14–0 win over Hillsdale. Next came Albion, fresh from a 26–12 loss to Michigan, who proved to be tough. The game ended in a 6–6 tie when substitute fullback John Studebaker fell on a fumble for the only Fighting Irish touchdown.

At the conclusion of the two-week contract Morrison left campus to take the head coaching job at Hillsdale College. His Irish charges finished the year 3–1–1, losing only to Albion in the season finale. At Hillsdale, Morrison spent just one week. His Hillsdale team was shut out 12–0 on the road at Albion.

In the spring of 1895, Morrison received his law degree from the University of Michigan. In 1896 he was the head football coach at Illinois College in Jacksonville, Illinois.

Head coaching record

References

Additional sources
 "Fighting Irish: Legends, Lists, and Lore" by Karen Croake Heisler
 The Fighting Irish Football Encyclopedia by Michael R. Steele
 "Olivet vs. Hillsdale" Hillsdale Herald, October 25, 1894
 Notre Dame Scholastic, October 20, 1894
 Notre Dame Scholastic, October 27, 1894
 Notre Dame Scholastic, November 3, 1894

Year of birth missing
Year of death missing
19th-century players of American football
American football tackles
Illinois College Blueboys football coaches
Hillsdale Chargers football coaches
Knox Prairie Fire football coaches
Michigan Wolverines football players
Notre Dame Fighting Irish football coaches
People from Christian County, Illinois
Players of American football from Illinois